is a railway station s a passenger railway station in the city of Kimitsu, Chiba Prefecture, Japan, operated by the East Japan Railway Company (JR East).

Lines
Kururi Station is a station on the Kururi Line, and is located 23.6 km from the terminus of the line at Kisarazu Station.

Station layout
Kururi Station has an island platform and a side platform serving three tracks. The station building is old, and dates from the original opening of the Kururi Line in 1912. It is one of the few fully staffed stations on the line. This is one of only 2 stations on the line where there is more than 1 track. The other station is Yokota Station.

Platform

Buses

Stage carriage bus 
There is a casual route bus which runs in October and November. This bus is called Satoyama GO Bus. The bus is bound for Kazusa-Nakano Station and stops at Yōrōkeikoku Station and so on.

Highway Bus 

There are buses which go to Haneda Airport from Kisarazu・Kaneda Bus Terminal. If you ride on  Aqusea, you available on the buses for Haneda Airport .
Highway bus Aqusea runs on Tokyo Bay Aqua Line.

History
Kururi Station was opened on December 28, 1912 as the original eastern terminal station for the Chiba Prefectural Railways Kururi Line. The line was nationalized into the Japanese Government Railways (JGR) on September 1, 1923. The JGR became the Japan National Railways (JNR) after World War II. The station was absorbed into the JR East network upon the privatization of the JNR on April 1, 1987.

Passenger statistics
In fiscal 2019, the station was used by an average of 365 passengers (boarding passengers only).

Surrounding area
 
Kururi Castle

See also
 List of railway stations in Japan

References

External links

   JR East Station information 

Kururi Line
Stations of East Japan Railway Company
Railway stations in Chiba Prefecture
Railway stations in Japan opened in 1912
Kimitsu